Pieta Military Cemetery Malta is a burial ground for military personnel and their dependants. It is located in the south west suburbs of Valletta, on a minor road (Triq id-Duluri). The following are cared for by the CWGC:
 1303 First World War commonwealth casualties buried or commemorated at the Cemetery (including 20 Indian servicemen and labourers of the Indian Army who were cremated at Lazaretto Cemetery)
 166 Second World War burials
 772 non-war graves in the cemetery
 15 war graves of other non-Commonwealth nationalities.

A large number of Australian and New Zealand service personnel are buried in the cemetery the highest concentration on Malta.

The first British serviceman buried at the cemetery was a group of British soldiers buried in 1866. The majority of those interred and remembered at the cemetery are casualties of the two World Wars (but mainly the First World War), many in communal graves. The last identifiable servicemen or dependant buried at the site is hard to ascertain as this is a mixed civilian and military cemetery.

The cemetery did not escape the aerial bombardment that Valletta and its environs experienced in WW2 and in April 1941 a Bomb Disposal team was called to deal with eight UXBs that had impacted in the graveyard. The team successfully defused the bombs without event.

Malta's CWGC Cemeteries became the centre of a controversy when the then Prime Minister of Malta Dom Mintoff was recorded as considering doing away with the island's war cemeteries in 1978; the threat was never carried out.

There are a number of CWGC graveyards and sites that are  cared for by the British Government through the auspices of the CWGC and somer of the larger collections of war graves can be found at the following locations:
 Pembroke Military Cemetery
 Capucinni Naval Cemetery (also known as Kalkara Naval Cemetery)
 Imtarfa Military Cemetery
 Malta Memorial – Valletta (not graves but commemorating those with no known grave)

See also
 Siege of Malta (World War II)

References

External links
 
 CWGC Guide for Malta
 British War Graves on Malta

British military memorials and cemeteries
World War II cemeteries
Pietà, Malta
Cemeteries in Malta
1866 establishments in Malta
Commonwealth War Graves Commission cemeteries in Malta